Cabrerolles (Languedocien: Cabrairòlas) is a commune in the Hérault department in southern France.

Winemaking
Cabrerolles is one of the seven communes which produces Faugères AOC wine.  As well as the main village, it has three hamlets, Lentheric, Liquière and Aigues-Vives, which all produce wine.

Population

See also
Communes of the Hérault department

References

Communes of Hérault